Lars Burgsmüller (born 6 December 1975) is a retired German professional tennis player. 

Burgsmüller reached a career-high ATP singles ranking of world No. 65, achieved on 18 February 2002. He also reached a career high ATP doubles ranking of world No. 61, achieved on 28 August 2006. 

Burgsmüller reached two singles finals on the ATP Tour, winning the 2002 Copenhagen Open in Denmark where he defeated Olivier Rochus of Belgium in the final in straight sets, and losing the final of the 2004 ATP Shanghai to Argentine Guillermo Cañas, also in straight sets. He also reached three doubles finals on the ATP Tour with three different partners. Partnered with Andrew Painter, he lost in the final of the 2000 Grand Prix Hassan II tournament in Casablanca falling in two sets to Frenchmen Sébastien Grosjean and Arnaud Clément. Alongside Jan Vacek he lost his next doubles final at the 2004 Ordina Open in 's-Hertogenbosch, Netherlands in three sets to Czech pairing Martin Damm and Cyril Suk. He would prove victorious in his third and last ATP doubles final appearance at the 2005 Ho Chi Minh City Open in Vietnam, where partnering compatriot Philipp Kohlschreiber he defeated Ashley Fisher and Robert Lindstedt in three sets.

ATP career finals

Singles: 2 (1 win, 1 loss)

Doubles: 3 (1 win, 2 losses)

ATP Challenger and ITF Futures finals

Singles: 11 (4–7)

Doubles: 11 (2–9)

Performance timelines

Singles

Doubles

External links
 
 
 
 

1975 births
Living people
German expatriate sportspeople in Switzerland
German male tennis players
Sportspeople from Mülheim
People from Altstätten
Tennis people from North Rhine-Westphalia